Delvada railway station is a  railway station on the Western Railway network in the state of Gujarat, India. Delvada  railway station is 160 km far away from Junagadh Junction railway station. Passenger trains halt here.

Major Trains 

 52949/52950 Delvada - Veraval MG Passenger (UnReserved)
 52951/52952 Delvada - Junagadh MG Passenger (UnReserved)

References

See also
 Gir Somnath district

Railway stations in Gir Somnath district
Bhavnagar railway division